Eminabad is a town located in the south east of Gujranwala city, Pakistan. It is 12 to 15 km away from Gujranwala city. According to the census of 2017 it has a population of 27,460 inhabitants.

References 

Cities and towns in Gujranwala District